Santa Caterina di Valfurva is a frazione of the comune of Valfurva, in the northern Italian province of Sondrio. It is home to a popular ski resort, which has held numerous FIS World Cup alpine races; Santa Caterina co-hosted the World Championships with Bormio in 1985 and 2005. The highest point of the resort is on the Monte Sobretta.

Geography
It is only accessible by road, via Bormio year round, and in the summer by the Passo Gavia, which connects to the Passo Valcamonica.

Climate
Lying at the base of an alpine valley, it has a typical alpine climate.

Notable people
 Achille Compagnoni, first man to reach the summit of K2.
 Deborah Compagnoni, triple Olympic gold medalist.

References

External links
Official homepage

Frazioni of the Province of Sondrio
Ski areas and resorts in Italy